Pimelea lehmanniana is a species of flowering plant in the family Thymelaeaceae and is endemic to the southwest of Western Australia. It is a shrub with narrowly egg-shaped leaves and clusters of white to pale yellow flowers surrounded by 4 or 6, pale yellowish-green involucral bracts.

Description
Flowering occurs from August to November.

Taxonomy
Pimelea lehmanniana was first formally described in 1845 by Carl Meissner in 1845 in Lehmann's Plantae Preissianae. The specific epithet (lehmanniana) honours Johann Georg Christian Lehmann.

In 1988, Barbara Lynette Rye described two subspecies of P. lehmanniana in the journal Nuytsia, and the names are accepted by the Australian Plant Census:
 Pimelea lehmanniana Meisn. subsp. lehmanniana has a circumscissile floral tube, the ovary-part hairy.
 Pimelea lehmanniana subsp. nervosa (Meisn.) Rye has a floral tube that is not circumscissile, and the ovary-part of the floral tube is glabrous.

Distribution and habitat
Subspecies lehmanniana grows on rocky hillsides or ridges from Lake Muir to East Mount Barren in the Avon Wheatbelt, Esperance Plains, Jarrah Forest and Mallee bioregions of south-western Western Australia, and subsp. nervosa grows in jarrah and marri woodland on the Darling Range and nearby hilly areas between Gooseberry Hill, Yelverton, Walpole and Mount Barker in separate parts of the Jarrah Forest and Swan Coastal Plain bioregions.

Conservation status
Both subspecies of P. lehmanniana are listed as "not threatened" by the Government of Western Australia Department of Biodiversity, Conservation and Attractions.

References

lehmanniana
Malvales of Australia
Taxa named by Carl Meissner
Plants described in 1845
Flora of Western Australia